WTCT (channel 27) is a religious television station licensed to Marion, Illinois, United States, serving the Paducah–Cape Girardeau–Harrisburg television market as the flagship station of the locally based Tri-State Christian Television (TCT) network. WTCT's transmitter is located near Goreville, Illinois. The national feed of TCT via WTCT is available on DirecTV channel 377.

History
The station signed on the air in August 1981 as independent station WDDD-TV. In 1984, the station's call letters were changed to WTCT and became a TBN station in 1986 along with a few independent stations that switched to the religious network during that year. The station also carried business news programming from the Financial News Network after the late movie each weeknight before sign-off until 1985. In 2007, the station became a TCT owned-and-operated station.

Technical information

Subchannels
The station's digital signal is multiplexed:

Analog-to-digital conversion
WTCT shut down its analog signal, over UHF channel 27, on June 12, 2009, the official date in which full-power television stations in the United States transitioned from analog to digital broadcasts under federal mandate. The station's digital signal remained on its pre-transition UHF channel 17. Through the use of PSIP, digital television receivers display the station's virtual channel as its former UHF analog channel 27.

Former translators
WTCT previously broadcast on low-power translators in Paducah, Kentucky on W54AE (channel 54), in Cape Girardeau, Missouri on KCGI-CA (channel 45), and in Sikeston, Missouri on K54CA (channel 54); these translators ceased operation around 2010.

References

External links
Tri-State Christian Television

Television channels and stations established in 1981
1981 establishments in Illinois
Television stations in the Paducah–Cape Girardeau–Harrisburg market
Tri-State Christian Television affiliates
Laff (TV network) affiliates
Bounce TV affiliates